Lucky Lindy or Charles Lindbergh (1902–1974) was a U.S. aviator.

Lucky Lindy may also refer to:
 "Lucky Lindy!", a 1927 song by Abel Baer and L. Wolfe Gilbert
 "Lucky Lindy", a Saturday Night Live sketch featuring Land Shark
 Lucky Lindy, a racehorse and 1992 winner of the Easter Stakes

See also

 Amelia Earhart (1897-1937; aka Lady Lindy), U.S. aviatrix
 List of people known as Lucky or the Lucky